In enzymology, an isoquinoline 1-oxidoreductase is an enzyme that catalyzes the chemical reaction

isoquinoline + acceptor + H2O  isoquinolin-1(2H)-one + reduced acceptor

The 3 substrates of this enzyme are isoquinoline, acceptor, and H2O, whereas its two products are isoquinolin-1(2H)-one and reduced acceptor.

This enzyme belongs to the family of oxidoreductases, specifically those acting on the CH-CH group of donor with other acceptors.  The systematic name of this enzyme class is isoquinoline:acceptor 1-oxidoreductase (hydroxylating).

References

 
 

EC 1.3.99
Enzymes of unknown structure